Parinati (English: The Inevitable) is a 1989 Hindi film directed by Prakash Jha. The film is based on a short story written by Vijaydan Detha

Awards
 Silver Lotus - Best Costume Design - 1989 (National Award)
 Presented as An Outstanding Film at the London Film Festival, 1989.

References

1989 films
1980s Hindi-language films
Films directed by Prakash Jha
Films based on Indian folklore
Films that won the Best Costume Design National Film Award